Langsdorfia beatrix is a moth in the family Cossidae. It is found in Guatemala.

The wingspan is about 34 mm. The forewings are white at the base, limited by an oblique black line from the costa to the submedian area and a finer line from the inner margin. The wing is otherwise white tinged with ocherous, crossed by fine fuscous brown striae. The hindwings are whitish grey with faint darker striae.

References

Natural History Museum Lepidoptera generic names catalog

Hypoptinae